This is a List of Old Brightonians, notable former students – known as "Old Brightonians" – of the co-educational, public school, Brighton College in Brighton, East Sussex, United Kingdom.

Academia, education and literature
Edward Carpenter (1844–1929), socialist writer and campaigner for homosexual rights
Robert H. Crabtree (born 1948), Organometallic Chemist, Professor of Inorganic Chemistry, Yale University, creator of Crabtree's catalyst
Andrew Gamble (born 1947), Professor of Politics, University of Sheffield and then University of Cambridge, Fellow of the British Academy
Francis Llewellyn Griffith (1862–1934), Egyptologist and pioneer of Nubian archaeology, first Professor of Egyptology, University of Oxford
George Bagshawe Harrison (1894–1991), Shakespearean scholar, Professor of English, Queen's University, Ontario and the University of Michigan, editor of the Penguin Shakespeare 1937–59, member of the Roman Catholic International Commission on English in the Liturgy
Sir Richard Jolly (born 1934), development economist, Assistant Secretary-General United Nations, Director Institute of Development Studies at the University of Sussex 1972–81
Ewart Mackintosh (1893–1917), First World War poet, MC
Michael Roberts (1908–1996), historian of Sweden, Professor of History at Queen's University Belfast, Fellow of the British Academy
Sir Sydney Roberts (1887–1966), Dr Johnson scholar, Master of Pembroke College, Cambridge, Secretary of Cambridge University Press and Vice-Chancellor of the University of Cambridge, Chairman British Film Institute
John Alfred Ryle (1889–1950), physician and Regius Professor of Physic, University of Cambridge 1935–45, physician to King George V
Gilbert Ryle (1900–1976), philosopher and Waynflete Professor of Metaphysical Philosophy, University of Oxford, declined a knighthood in 1965
Ian Serraillier (1912–1994), novelist, children's writer and poet
Robert Skidelsky, Baron Skidelsky of Tilton (born 1939), Professor of Political Economy, University of Warwick, created a life peer (changed whip from SDP to Conservative to cross-bencher)
Leonard Strong (1896–1958), writer and poet, Director of Methuen Ltd

Architecture, building and engineering
Sir Francis Fox (1844–1927), civil engineer, responsible for Mersey Railway Tunnel and the Snowdon Mountain Railway, consultant engineer for the Simplon Tunnel, consultant engineer in the restoration of Exeter Cathedral, Lincoln Cathedral, Peterborough Cathedral, St Paul's Cathedral and Winchester Cathedral
Charles Fraser-Smith (1904–1992), missionary, farmer, creator of gadgets for SOE during World War II and as such the model for Q in Ian Fleming's James Bond stories
Sir Thomas Graham Jackson (1835–1924), architect and architectural historian, Master of the Art Workers' Guild 1896, RA

Business
Sir Hugo Cunliffe-Owen (1870–1947), civil engineer, Chairman of British American Tobacco
Cuthbert Heath (1859–1939), insurance pioneer at Lloyd's of London
Sir Arthur Pease, Bt. (1866–1927), coal magnate, Second Civil Lord of the Admiralty
David Quayle (1936–2010), co-founder of B&Q
Sir George Reeves-Smith (1863–1941), managing director of the Savoy Company

Community and philanthropy
Frederick Nicholas Charrington (1850–1936), Temperance worker and social reformer
Mervyn Cowie (1909–1996), conservationist, founding Director of the Kenya National Park Service
Alsager Hay Hill (1839–1906), social reformer on poor law and unemployment issues
Ken Stevens (1922–2005), chief executive The Scout Association

Entertainment, media and the arts
John Castle (born 1940), actor
Dave Clarke (born c.1969), techno producer and disc jockey
Tom Conway (1904–1967), actor
Peter Copley (born 1962), composer and cellist
Roland Curram (born c.1932) actor and novelist
Wilfrid de Glehn (1870–1951), impressionist painter, RA
Simon Dee (1935–2009) (real name Cyril Henty-Dodd), radio disk jockey and television presenter, Sixties celebrity and inspiration for Austin Powers
Rose Elinor Dougall (born 1986), musician, former member of The Pipettes
Tim Hadcock-Mackay, TV shows presenter
Christopher Hassall (1912–1963), writer and librettist
Tony Hawks (born c.1960), comedian and author
Gavin Henderson (born c.1947), Principal of Trinity College of Music and Chairman of Youth Music
McDonald Hobley (1917–1987), actor, TV and radio presenter, TV Personality of the Year 1954
Sir Michael Hordern (1911–1995), actor
Menhaj Huda (born 1967), film producer and director
Selwyn Image (1849–1930), designer, illustrator and poet, joint founder of the Century Guild, Master of the Art Workers' Guild 1900, Slade Professor at Oxford 1910 and 1913
Graham Kerr (born 1934), author, chef and television presenter, known as "The Galloping Gourmet"
Bruce Lester (1912–2008), actor
Miles Malleson (1888–1969), actor, playwright and scriptwriter
Peter Mayle (born 1939), writer. He has written that he loathed the school.
Tamzin Merchant (born 1987), actress
Leonard Merrick (1864–1939), writer
David Nash (born 1945), sculptor, RA
Laurie Penny (1986–present), journalist
Sir Edward Poynter (1836–1919), painter, art educator and President of the Royal Academy
George Sanders (1906–1972), actor. Won Academy Award for Best Supporting Actor 1950. He said in his biography that he hated the school.
Bijan Sheibani (born 1979), award-winning theatre director
Chris Terrill (born 1952) Anthropologist, adventurer and multi award-winning documentary maker including  Royal Television Society award for Innovation for Soho Stories (1997), Emmy for Ape Trade (1992)
John Warner (1924–2001), actor
John Worsley (1919–2000), artist and illustrator, World War II official war artist and creator of Albert RN, President Royal Society of Marine Artists
Vera Filatova (born 1982), Actress
Dakota Blue Richards (born 1994), Actress
Chloé Zhao (born 1982), filmmaker, won Academy Award for Best Director 2021

Medicine and science
Leslie Collier (1920–2011), virologist, Director of the Lister Institute laboratories, Professor of Virology at the University of London 1966–88
Sir Ronald Hatton (1886–1965), horticulturist, Fellow of the Royal Society
John Alfred Ryle (1889–1950), physician and Regius Professor of Physic, University of Cambridge 1935–45, physician to King George V
Sir George Savage (1842–1921), psychiatrist

Military
Lieutenant-Colonel Leonard Berney (1920-2016), Bergen-Belsen concentration camp liberator
Alfred Carpenter (1847–1925), naval officer, commander Marine Survey of India, piloted the Burma Field Force up the River Irrawaddy in 1885 (awarded DSO), Albert Medal (Challenger Scientific Expedition)
Air Commodore Lionel Charlton (1879–1958), Royal Flying Corps and Royal Air Force officer, Air Attache Washington 1919–22, as Chief Air Staff Officer Iraq Command in 1924 he resigned in protest at the policy of policing by bombing civilian targets, in retirement a successful author of children's fiction, wrote a series of influential books on air defence 1935–38
Brigadier-General Frank Crozier (1879–1937), commander of the British Mission to Lithuania, 1919–20, commander of the Black and Tans, 1920–21, military author and co-founder of the Peace Pledge Union
Air Marshal Sir Humphrey Edwardes Jones (1905–1987), inaugural Commander-in-Chief, RAF Germany
Colonel Sir George Malcolm Fox (1843–1918), Inspector of Gymnasia and sword designer
Admiral Sir Herbert Heath (1861–1954), Rear-Admiral Commanding 2nd Cruiser Squadron at Jutland in 1916, Second Sea Lord
General Sir William Peyton (1866–1931), commanded Western Frontier Force against the Senussi 1916, Military Secretary to Sir Douglas Haig 1916–18, commanded 40th Infantry Division July 1918 – March 1919 in France and Flanders, Military Secretary to Secretary of State for War 1922–26, Commander-in-Chief Scottish Command 1926–30
General Sir Harry Prendergast (1834–1913), Victoria Cross, Indian Army soldier, commander of the Burma Field Force 1885–86
Major-General Sir Herbert Stewart (1843–1885), army staff officer, commanded the Desert Column to relieve Khartoum, mortally wounded at Abu Klea
General Sir Cecil Sugden (1903–1963), Quartermaster-General to the Forces and Master-General of the Ordnance
Lieutenant-General Sir Francis Tuker (1894–1967), Indian Army officer and military historian, commander 4th Indian Division, 1941–44

Politics, public service and the law
Robert Alexander, Baron Alexander of Weedon (1936–2005), barrister, banker, politician and Chancellor of the University of Exeter
Sir Edmund Barnard (1856–1930), Chairman of the Metropolitan Water Board, Chairman of Hertfordshire County Council, Liberal MP for Kidderminster, Cambridge polo blue
Sir Max Bemrose (1904–1986), Chairman of Bemrose Corporation, Chairman National Union of Conservative and Unionist Associations, High Sheriff of Derbyshire
Keith Best (born 1949), lawyer and politician, Conservative MP for Anglesey and Ynys Mon 1979–87 (resigned and prosecuted for fraud), Director Prisoners Abroad 1989–93, chief executive Immigration Advisory Service, Chairman Conservative Action for Electoral Reform, Chairman of the Executive Committee World Federalist Movement
Andrew Cayley CMG QC FRSA (born 1964), barrister specialising in international criminal law, public international law and international arbitration. Formerly Senior Prosecuting Counsel at the ICTY and ICC and the UN International Chief Co-Prosecutor of the Khmer Rouge Tribunal in Cambodia and currently the United Kingdom's Director of Service Prosecutions.
Sir John Chilcot (1939–2021), Permanent Under-Secretary of State, Northern Ireland Office, 1990–97
Sir Henry John Stedman Cotton (1845–1915), Indian civil servant, Chief Commissioner of Assam, President of the Indian National Congress and Liberal MP for Nottingham East 1906–10
Eric Gandar Dower (1894–1987), air pioneer and Conservative MP for Caithness and Sutherland 1945–50
William Fuller-Maitland (1844–1932), cricketer and politician, Oxford blue, played for the MCC, the Gentlemen, I Zingari and Essex, Liberal MP for Breconshire 1875–95
Alan Green (1911–1991), Conservative MP for Preston South 1955–64 and 1970–74, Financial Secretary to the Treasury 1963–64
Sir Thomas Erskine Holland (1835–1926), Chichele Professor of International Law and Diplomacy, University of Oxford and legal historian
Francis Hughes-Hallett (1838–1903), soldier and politician, Colonel Royal Artillery, Conservative MP for Rochester 1885–89 (resigned in a sex scandal)
Sir Clement Kinloch-Cooke (1854–1944), barrister and politician, MP Devonport (Conservative) 1910–23 and Cardiff East (Unionist) 1924–29, created baronet
Augustus Margary (1846–1875), Chinese Consular Service officer and explorer in China
Sir Hubert Murray (1861–1940), Lieutenant-Governor of Papua New Guinea
Denzil Roberts Onslow (1839–1908), Conservative MP for Guildford 1874–85, played cricket for Cambridge University, Sussex and the MCC
Herbert Pike Pease, 1st Baron Daryngton (1867–1949), Liberal Unionist and then Unionist MP for Darlington, Assistant Postmaster-General, Privy Councillor and Ecclesiastical Commissioner
Charles Campbell Ross (1849–1920), banker and politician, Conservative MP for St Ives 1881–85
Sir Walter Shaw (1863–1937), judge, Chief Justice of the Straits Settlements
Arthur Wellesley Soames (1852–1934), Liberal MP for South Norfolk 1898–1918, son of the Brighton College founder William Aldwin Soames
George Hampden Whalley (1851–1917), Liberal MP for Peterborough 1880–83 resigned and declared bankrupt, imprisoned for theft, emigrated to Australia, and vanished

Religion
Timothy Bavin (born 1935), Anglican priest and Benedictine monk, Bishop of Johannesburg and then Portsmouth
John Neville Figgis (1866–1919), Anglican priest, member of the Community of the Resurrection, church historian, theologian and political theorist
Cecil Horsley (1906–1953), Anglican priest, Bishop of Colombo 1938–47 and then Gibraltar 1947–53
Wilfrid John Hudson (1904–1981), Anglican priest, Bishop of Carpentaria 1950–60 and then coadjutor Bishop of Brisbane 1960–73
Frederick Meyer (1847–1929), Baptist minister and evangelist, social reformer, President of the Baptist Union, dubbed "archbishop of the free churches"
Arthur Stretton Reeve (1907–1981), Cambridge rowing blue (1930) and Anglican priest, Bishop of Lichfield 1953–74
 Cecily Overli (born 1976) resident of Dunsfold and avid lover of chapel. Proud member of Netball L team.

Sport
Gordon Belcher (1885–1915), cricketer (son of Thomas Belcher, headmaster of the College)
Tom Campbell Black (1899–1936), aviator, joint winner London-Melbourne Centenary Air Race 1934, awarded Britannia Trophy 1934
William Churchill (1840–1907), cricketer
Holly Colvin (born 1989), England cricketer
Maurice Conde-Williams (1885–1967), naval officer and cricketer, played for the Royal Navy and Devon
George Huth Cotterill (1868–1950), England footballer, Corinthian 1886–98, Cambridge football blue 1888–91, played cricket for Sussex 1886–90
Clare Connor (born 1976), England cricket captain
John Cressy-Hall (1843–1894), cricketer
Freya Davies (born 1995), England cricketer
Robert Dewing (1863–1934), cricketer
Harry Freeman (1887–1926), cricketer
Joe Gatting (born 1987), former footballer for Brighton and Hove Albion, current cricketer for Sussex
Leslie Gay (1871–1949), England footballer, England cricketer 1894–95, Cambridge blue, Hampshire and Somerset
Leslie Godfree (?–?), tennis player, won Men's Doubles at Wimbledon 1923 and Mixed Doubles 1926 (finalist 1924 and 1927)
Chris Grammer (born 1984), cricketer
Sam Grant (born 1995), cricketer
Duncan Hamilton (1920–1994), racing driver
John Hart (born 1982), Wasps rugby union player
Geoffrey Hett, (1909–88), fencer, Captain Cambridge University Fencing 1930, British Foil Team 1936 Olympics, author of a standard work on Fencing
Carl Hopkinson (born 1981), cricketer
Bazid Khan (born 1981), Pakistan cricketer
Alex King (born 1975), England and Wasps rugby union player
Richard Kirwan (1829–1872), cricketer
'Hopper' Levett (1908–1995), England, Kent and MCC cricketer (wicket-keeper)
Gordon Lyon (1905–1932), cricketer
Matt Machan (born 1991), Sussex cricketer
Laura Marsh (born 1986), England cricketer
Ralph Oliphant-Callum (born 1971), played first-class cricket for Oxford University
Denzil Roberts Onslow (1839–1908), played cricket for Cambridge University, Sussex and MCC, Conservative MP for Guildford 1874–85
Jonathan Palmer (born 1956), racing driver
Ollie Phillips (born 1982), England and Newcastle Falcons rugby union player
Matt Prior (born 1982), England cricketer
Malcolm Waller (born 1984) Zimbabwe Cricket player
George Colin Ratsey (1906–1984), sailmaker and sailor, silver medal 2-man Star class 1932 Olympics, Prince of Wales Cup winner (14 ft dinghies) 1939, Prince Philip Cup winner (Dragon class) 1959, in the crew for two British attempts at the America's Cup 1934 and 1958
Major Ritchie (1870–1955), tennis player, gold medal men's singles 1906 Olympics, silver medal men's doubles 1906 Olympics, bronze medal men's indoor singles 1906 Olympics, Wimbledon doubles champion 1906 and 1910, Irish singles champion 1907, German singles champion 1903–06 and 1910, British Davis Cup team 1910
Henry Soames (1843–1913) Hampshire cricketer, son of the Brighton College founder William Aldwin Soames
Kelvin Tatum (born 1964), British speedway captain
Sarah Taylor (born 1989), England cricketer
Claude Wilson (1858–1881), England footballer
Sammy Woods (1867–1931), Somerset cricketer, played cricket for both Australia and England; and England rugby player and captain
Jordan Turner-Hall (born 1988), England and Harlequins rugby union player
Harry Leonard (born 1992), Scotland and Rosslyn Park professional rugby union player
Ollie Richards (born 1992), England rugby union player
Ross Chisholm (born 1990), Harlequins professional rugby union player
James Chisholm (born 1995), Harlequins professional rugby union player
Todd Gleave (born 1995), Gloucester Rugby professional rugby union player
Charles Ward (1838–1892), cricketer
Calum Waters (born 1996), Harlequins professional rugby union player
Marcus Smith (born 1999), Harlequins professional rugby union player
Leonard Stileman-Gibbard (1856–1939), cricketer

Notable Brighton College staff
Grant Allen (1848–1899), novelist, author of The Woman Who Did (1896)
Thomas Belcher (1847–1919), cricketer and headmaster of Brighton College 1881–92
William Bennett ("Fusty"), wireless pioneer, research scientist at the Admiralty during the First World War
Rt Rev. Christopher Butler (1902–1986), Benedictine monk, Abbot of Downside Abbey 1946–66, Council Father at the Second Vatican Council, Auxiliary Bishop of Westminster
Bertie Corbett (1875–1967), played association football for Oxford, the Corinthians and England, played hockey for England, played cricket for Buckinghamshire and Derbyshire
Rt Rev. Henry Cotterill, Vice-Principal of Brighton College 1846–51, Principal of Brighton College 1851–56, Bishop of Grahamston, South Africa 1856–71, Coadjutor Bishop of Edinburgh 1871–72, Bishop of Edinburgh 1872–86
Rodney Fox, Headmaster of King Edward's School, Witley, Chairman of the Governors of Ryde School, Isle of Wight
Jack Hindmarsh (1927–2009), Professor at Trinity College of Music
Frank Harris (c. 1856–1931), notorious author, traveller, intriguer and fantasist
Walter Ledermann, Professor of Mathematics at the University of Sussex 1965–78
Professor George Long (1800–1879), classical scholar, inaugural Professor of Ancient Languages at the University of Virginia, inaugural Professor of Greek at University College London, Professor of Latin at University College London, co-founder and Honorary Secretary of the Royal Geographical Society
James Wainwright, Warden of Trinity College, Glenalmond
Frederick Madden (1839–1904), numismatist, Secretary and Bursar of Brighton College 1874–88. Chief Librarian, Brighton Public Library 1888–1902

References

External links
Brighton College
Brighton College Alumni

Brighton and Hove-related lists
Lists of people by English school affiliation